Ptychocroca nigropenicillia is a species of moth of the family Tortricidae. It is found in Chile (Santiago Province and Valparaíso Region).

Etymology
The species name refers to the black scaling surrounding the hindwing hair-pencil.

References

Moths described in 2003
Euliini
Moths of South America
Taxa named by Józef Razowski
Endemic fauna of Chile